Artifex melanopyga, synonym Phonognatha melanopyga, referred to as a leaf curling spider, is a common Australian spider found in moist coastal areas of New South Wales and Queensland. A small member of the family Araneidae, the orb-weavers, it was previously placed in Tetragnathidae.

Description
The spider is distinguished by having a curled leaf at the centre of its web, in which it shelters. The abdomen is a plump oval or egg shape, light in colour with a dark mark at the rear from which the species name "melanopyga" is derived. Additional dark marks form a pattern dorsally on the abdomen. The legs are light brown with the joints darker. Females are 9mm in length and males 7mm.

References

Araneidae
Spiders of Australia
Spiders described in 1871